The 1988 South Carolina Gamecocks football team represented the University of South Carolina as an independent during the 1988 NCAA Division I-A football season. They compiled a record of 8–4 with a loss against Indiana in the Liberty Bowl. The Gamecocks were led by head coach Joe Morrison in his final season as head coach prior to his dying of a heart attack in February 1989.

Schedule

Roster
Todd Ellis – QB;
Mike Dingle – RB;
Harold Green – RB;
Robert Brooks – WR;
Jamie Penland- WR;
Patrick Hinton – LB;
Ron Rabune – Safety;
Robert Robinson – CB;
Kevin Hendrix – DE;
Collin Mackie – Kicker;
Keith Bing – RB
Mike Dingle – RB
Gerald Williams – RB
Albert Haynes – RB
Ray Bolton – RB
Eddie Miller WR
Carl Platt – WR
George Rush – WR
Anthony Parlor – WR
Hardin Brown – WR
Vic McConnell – WR
Bill Zorr – WR
Darren Greene – WR
Ken Watson – TE
Trent Simpson – TE
Mark Fryer – OL
Ike Harris – OL
Randy Harwell – OL 
Paul Shivers – OL 
Calvin Stephens – OL 
Dany Branch – OL 
Charles Gowan – OL 
Kenny Haynes – OL 
Marty Dye – DL
Derrick Frazier – DL
Tim High – DL
David Taylor – DL
Patrick Blackwell – DL
Kevin Hendrix – DL
Kurt Wilson – DL
Theartis Woodard – DL
Patrick Hinton – LB
Derrick Little – LB
Matt McKernan – LB
Corey Miller – LB
Keith Emmons – LB
Mike Tolbert – DB
Ron Rabune . DB
Robert Robinson – DB
Stephane Williams – DB
Dale Campbell – DB
Mike Conway – DB
Pat Turner – DB

Coaching staff
 Joe Morrison, head coach
 Al Groh, offensive coordinator
 Joe Lee Dunn, defensive coordinator
 Charlie Weis, assistant coach
 Fred Jackson, quarterbacks and wide receivers coach

References

Additional sources
 Griffin, J. C. (1992). The First Hundred Years: A History of South Carolina Football. Atlanta: Longstreet Press

South Carolina
South Carolina Gamecocks football seasons
South Carolina Gamecocks football